Fani Chalkia (born February 2, 1979), also transliterated as Halkia or Khalkia, is a retired Greek hurdler.

Chalkia was born in Larissa, and represented Olympiacos. She won the gold medal in the women's 400m hurdles at the 2004 Summer Olympics in Athens. During the semifinals Chalkia set an Olympic record of 52.77 seconds.

On August 16, 2008, during the 2008 Summer Olympics in Beijing it was announced that she tested positive for the banned substance methyltrienolone. Chalkia denied she had taken any banned substance, and asked for her 'B' sample to be tested, which also tested positive the next day. On November 26, 2008, the Greek Athletics Federation announced that she would serve a two year ban from the sport effective from August when Chalkia was expelled from the 2008 Summer Olympics.

In 2015, a Greek court convicted Chalkia of intentional doping and handed her a seven month jail sentence, suspended pending an appeal; this appeal was successful as on February 19, 2016, Chalkia was unanimously acquitted by the Athens Court of Appeal of all charges for the intentional use of banned substances. The court ruled that the former champion had fallen victim to a circuit of adulterated drugs, and also acquitted her trainer Giorgos Panagiotopoulos, who was facing charges of intentionally supplying banned substances.

Personal bests

Honours

References

External links 
 

1979 births
Living people
Greek female hurdlers
Greek female sprinters
Athletes from Larissa
Athletes (track and field) at the 2004 Summer Olympics
Olympic athletes of Greece
Olympic gold medalists for Greece
Doping cases in athletics
Greek sportspeople in doping cases
European Athletics Championships medalists
Medalists at the 2004 Summer Olympics
Olympiacos Athletics athletes
Olympic gold medalists in athletics (track and field)